15 Éxitos de Juan Gabriel is a compilation album released by Juan Gabriel in 1981. Re-released on August 3, 2004.

Tracklistng

References 

2004 compilation albums
Juan Gabriel compilation albums